The Bendigo Football Netball League (previously known as the Sandhurst Football Association, Bendigo and District Football Association, Bendigo Football Association and Bendigo Football League) is an Australian rules football and netball competition based in the Bendigo region of Victoria.

Formed on 10 June 1881 by the city's three clubs as the Sandhurst Football Association, it is one of the oldest football leagues in Australia, and among its members are some of the oldest football clubs in Australia, including the Castlemaine Football Club, acknowledged as the second oldest football club in Australia and one of the oldest in the world.

Clubs Location

Current Clubs

Former Clubs

 Bendigo Football Club
 Bendigo East Football Club
 California Gully Football Club
 Coachbuilders Football Club
 Echuca Football Club
 Echuca East Football Club
 Elmore Football Club
 Kennington-Strathdale Football Club
 Lockington Bamawm United Football Club
 Long Gully Football Club
 Marong Football Club
 North Ballarat City Football Club
 North Bendigo Football Club
 North Sandhurst Football Club
 Northern United Football Club
 Provincial Football Club
 Rochester Football Club
 West Bendigo Football Club
 White Hills Football Club
 YCW Football Club

Senior Football Premierships

 	1880	Bendigo
 	1881	Sandhurst
 	1882	Eaglehawk
 	1883	Eaglehawk
 	1884	Sandhurst
 	1885	Sandhurst
 	1886	Eaglehawk
 	1887	Eaglehawk
 	1888	Bendigo
 	1889	Eaglehawk
 	1890	Sandhurst
 	1891	Sandhurst
 	1892	Bendigo
 	1893	Sandhurst
 	1894	Eaglehawk
 	1895	Eaglehawk
 	1896	Eaglehawk
 	1897	Eaglehawk
 	1898	Eaglehawk
 	1899	South Bendigo
 	1900	South Bendigo
 	1901	Eaglehawk
 	1902	South Bendigo
 	1903	Eaglehawk
 	1904	South Bendigo
 	1905	South Bendigo
 	1906	Eaglehawk
 	1907	Long Gully
 	1908	Eaglehawk
 	1909	South Bendigo
 	1910	South Bendigo
 	1911	South Bendigo
 	1912	South Bendigo
 	1913	Bendigo
 	1914	South Bendigo
 	1915	In recess, WWI
 	1916	In recess, WWI
 	1917	In recess, WWI
 	1918	In recess, WWI

 	1919	South Bendigo
 	1920	Sandhurst
 	1921	South Bendigo
 	1922	Eaglehawk
 	1923	Sandhurst
 	1924	Eaglehawk
 	1925	South Bendigo
 	1926	Castlemaine
 	1927	Sandhurst
 	1928	Echuca
 	1929	Sandhurst
 	1930	Sandhurst
 	1931	Sandhurst
 	1932	Sandhurst
 	1933	Sandhurst
 	1934	Sandhurst
 	1935	Eaglehawk
 	1936	Kyneton
 	1937	Sandhurst
 	1938	Golden Square
 	1939	Golden Square
 	1940	Sandhurst
 	1941	Eaglehawk
 	1942	In recess, WW2
 	1943	In recess, WW2
 	1944	In recess, WW2
 	1945	Golden Square
 	1946	Eaglehawk
 	1947	Sandhurst
 	1948	Sandhurst
 	1949	Sandhurst
 	1950	South Bendigo
 	1951	South Bendigo
 	1952	Castlemaine
 	1953	Eaglehawk
 	1954	South Bendigo
 	1955	South Bendigo
 	1956	Sandhurst
 	1957	Eaglehawk

 	1958	Rochester
 	1959	Rochester
 	1960	Kyneton
 	1961	Kyneton
 	1962	Rochester
 	1963	Rochester
 	1964	Golden Square
 	1965	Golden Square
 	1966	Kyneton
 	1967	Echuca
 	1968	Eaglehawk
 	1969	South Bendigo
 	1970	Echuca
 	1971	Eaglehawk
 	1972	Golden Square
 	1973	Sandhurst
 	1974	South Bendigo
 	1975	Golden Square
 	1976	Golden Square
 	1977	Sandhurst
 	1978	Sandhurst
 	1979	Golden Square
 	1980	Golden Square
 	1981	Sandhurst
 	1982	Eaglehawk
 	1983	Sandhurst
 	1984	Northern United
 	1985	Northern United
 	1986	Northern United
 	1987	Northern United
 	1988	Golden Square
 	1989	Golden Square
 	1990	South Bendigo
 	1991	South Bendigo
 	1992	Castlemaine
 	1993	South Bendigo
 	1994	South Bendigo
 	1995	Kyneton
 	1996	Kangaroo Flat

 	1997	Kyneton
 	1998	Maryborough
 	1999	Maryborough
 	2000	Castlemaine
 	2001	Golden Square
 	2002	Gisborne
 	2003	Gisborne
 	2004	Sandhurst
 	2005	Gisborne
 	2006	Gisborne
 	2007	Eaglehawk
 	2008	Eaglehawk
 	2009	Golden Square
 	2010	Golden Square
 	2011	Golden Square
 	2012 Golden Square
 	2013 Golden Square
   2014 Strathfieldsaye
   2015 Strathfieldsaye
   2016 Sandhurst
   2017 Strathfieldsaye
   2018 Eaglehawk
   2019 Strathfieldsaye
   2020 Season cancelled due to COVID-19 pandemic
   2021 Season abandoned after Rd.17, due to COVID-19 pandemic
 	2022	Gisborne

 2022 Gisborne

Football: Best & Fairest Award / Goalkicking
Seniors
In 1929, the Bendigo Football League (BFL) decided to perpetuate the memory of the late BFL President, Mr. Fred A. Wood with a gold medal for the best and fairest player from 1930 to 1939.

In 1946, the BFL best and fairest award was named the Arthur E. Cook Medal, in memory of the late Bendigo MLA, who died suddenly at the Victorian Parliament House in April, 1945,. For many years, Cook was associated with the administration of the BFL.

Between 1947 and 1951 the award was known as the Thomas Rees Davies Medal, after a former Bendigo Councillor, Eaglehawk Mayor and BFL President from 1935 to 1939. Davies was a former Eaglehawk footballer and club Secretary and also Secretary of the BFL too. He was made a life member of the BFL in 1926.

The Jack Michelsen Medal was first awarded in 1952, after a prominent Bendigo Mayor, long term Councillor and BFL President from 1923 to 1925, John Andrew Michelsen, OBE. Michelsen was a journalist at the Bendigo Advertiser for many years.

Goals in brackets includes goals kicked in finals.

2000 Ladder

2001 Ladder

2002 Ladder

2003 Ladder

2004 Ladder

2005 Ladder

2006 Ladder

2007 Ladder

2008 Ladder

2009 Ladder

2010 Ladder

2011 Ladder

2012 Ladder

2013 Ladder

2014 Ladder

2015 Ladder

2016 Ladder

2017 Ladder

2018 Ladder

2019 Ladder

2020 Ladder

2021 Ladder 
Home & Away Season was reduced by 6 rounds and Finals series cancelled due to COVID-19 pandemic in Victoria

2022 Ladder

References

External links
 
 Archive of Full Points Footy -Bendigo Football League

 
Australian rules football competitions in Victoria (Australia)
Sport in Bendigo
1880 establishments in Australia
Sports leagues established in 1880
Netball leagues in Victoria (Australia)
Bendigo